The Pearl River County School District is a public school district based in the community of Carriere, Mississippi (USA).

In addition to Carriere, the district serves rural areas in south central Pearl River County.

Schools
Pearl River Central High School (Grades 9-12)
Pearl River Central Middle School (Grades 6-8)
2004 National Blue Ribbon School
Pearl River Central Upper Elementary School (Grades 3-5)
Pearl River Central Lower Elementary School (Grades K-2)

Demographics

2006-07 school year
There were a total of 3,176 students enrolled in the Pearl River County School District during the 2006–2007 school year. The gender makeup of the district was 48% female and 52% male. The racial makeup of the district was 4.35% African American, 93.80% White, 1.23% Hispanic, 0.31% Asian, and 0.31% Native American. 37.8% of the district's students were eligible to receive free lunch.

Previous school years

Accountability statistics

See also
List of school districts in Mississippi

References

External links
 

Education in Pearl River County, Mississippi
School districts in Mississippi